Branko Bošnjak (born 11 October 1955) is a former Yugoslav international football midfielder who played in the former Yugoslavia and Turkey.

Club career
Born in Sarajevo, Bosnia, Bošnjak started playing football for local side FK Sarajevo in the Yugoslav First League. He would join fellow First League side NK Olimpija Ljubljana in 1979. In 1985, Bošnjak moved to Turkey, joining Kayserispor for two seasons. He would make 28 Süper Lig appearances for the club.

International career
Bošnjak made one appearance for the senior Yugoslavia national football team, entering as a substitute in a friendly against Romania on 1 June 1983.

References

External links
 
 
 
 Profile at Kayserispor.org

1955 births
Living people
Footballers from Sarajevo
Association football midfielders
Yugoslav footballers
Yugoslavia international footballers
FK Sarajevo players
NK Olimpija Ljubljana (1945–2005) players
GNK Dinamo Zagreb players
Kayserispor footballers
Yugoslav First League players
Yugoslav Second League players
Süper Lig players
TFF First League players
Yugoslav expatriate footballers
Expatriate footballers in Turkey
Yugoslav expatriate sportspeople in Turkey